Jada Rowland (born February 23, 1943) is an American actress and illustrator.

Actress
Rowland was born into a family of actors and artists. She has appeared on Broadway and television, most notably in daytime soap operas. She has appeared as Dr. Susan Stewart on As the World Turns and Carolee Simpson Aldrich, R. N. #2 on The Doctors starting September 6, 1976, until the final episode on December 31, 1982. She later appeared on the prime-time serial The Hamptons. She was offered an audition for the Dustin Hoffman film Tootsie, since that feature film incorporated a fictional soap opera, Southwest General, but she rejected it.

Rowland is the sister of actor Jeffrey Rowland and actress Gigi Anderson. Her brother played her husband on As the World Turns (Dr. Dan Stewart), although they appeared on the show in different years. Rowland's sister appeared on The Secret Storm as Peggy Bennett during the time Rowland was working on the show.

In her most notable role, Rowland portrayed Amy Ames Britton Kincaid on The Secret Storm for most of its 20-year run. This character had the distinction of growing up in real time rather than by means of the often-used soap-opera phenomenon of "rapid aging", where a young actor is replaced by an older one to age the character more quickly.

In the early 1970s, the father of Rowland's son Sparks was murdered.

Rowland's biography, on her webpage, says: "And finally, in 1983, tired of acting, never having been unemployed for more than three months at a time, and having the opportunity to join her astrophysicist husband on sabbatical in Denmark, she took a big gamble. She decided to fulfill a lifelong desire to be a professional artist and writer; she quit acting. She has kept on drawing and painting and writing."

Illustrator
Published children's books she has illustrated include: Bringing the Farmhouse Home (by Gloria Whelan, Simon & Schuster Books for Young Readers, 1992); Miss Tizzy (by Libba Moore Gray, Simon & Schuster Books for Young Readers, 1993); The Statue of Liberty (by Lucille Recht Penner, Random House, 1995); and Raising the Roof (by Ronald Kidd, Habitat for Humanity International, 1995).

Residence
She resides in Manhattan.

External links
 
http://www.broadwayworld.com/people/Jada-Rowland/
https://jadajada.info/jada.html
http://northforker.com/2014/09/27/artist-profile-jada-rowland-of-greenport/?ic_source=ic-featured-frontpage-top

American soap opera actresses
1943 births
Living people
21st-century American women